This is a list of individuals who were former or serving Members of Parliament for the House of Commons of the United Kingdom who died in the 2010s.

2010

2011

2012

2013

2014

2015

2016

2017

2018

2019

See also
List of United Kingdom MPs who died in the 1990s
List of United Kingdom MPs who died in the 2000s
List of United Kingdom MPs who died in the 2020s

Notes 

Died in the 2010s
2010s politics-related lists